Switzerland's Next Topmodel season 2 is the second season of Switzerland's Next Topmodel (often abbreviated to SNTM). It aired on ProSieben Schweiz from October to November 2019. Like last season, the show introduced a division of also male models have a change of winning the competition. The show was hosted by Topmodel Manuela Frey. The international destination was Berlin.

The winner will receive a modeling contract with Time Model Agency, a cover and spread in 20 Minuten Friday Magazine, a campaign for Nivea and a Nissan Micra.

Contestants
(ages stated are at start of contest)

Results table 

 The contestant was in danger of elimination
 The contestant was eliminated
 The contestant was eliminated outside of the judging panel
 The contestant won the competition

Photo shoots 
Episode 1 photo shoot: Promo shoot (semifinals)
Episode 2 photo shoot: Swimwear with Splashing Water
Episode 3 photo shoot: Sedcard
Episode 4 photo shoots: At the Racetrack and Hanging from a Ladder
Episode 5 photo shoot: 20 Minuten Friday Magazine Cover

References

Top Model